Yuknessia is an early pterobranch, known from the Burgess shale,  the Chengjiang and the Wheeler shale. Long, unbranched fronds emerge from a central holdfast-like body covered in small conical plates. 23  specimens of Yuknessia are known from the Greater Phyllopod bed, where they comprise  < 0.1% of the community. The genus contains two species: the type species Y. simplex and Y. stephenensis. It was originally interpreted as a green alga, and has since been reinterpreted it as a colonial pterobranch.

References

External links 
 "Yuknessia simplex". Burgess Shale Fossil Gallery. Virtual Museum of Canada. 2011. (Burgess Shale species 136)

Burgess Shale fossils
Enigmatic deuterostome taxa
Prehistoric animal genera
Wheeler Shale
Burgess Shale animals

Cambrian genus extinctions